Exhibition Park is an exhibition complex located on the eastern edge of Lethbridge, Alberta. It was established in 1897.

Facilities

Permanent structures at the site include a 10,664 m² (114,787 ft²) pavilion complex (main, north, west and south pavilions, and Saddle Room), Heritage Hall, Pioneer Park, a grandstand, and Whoop-Up Downs.

In March of 2021, renovations began on the Exhibition Grounds. The project cost $70.5 Million and is expected to complete as early as 2023. The project was funded by the Government of Alberta’s recovery program.

Events

Roughly 950 events are held at the park every year, which attract over 850,000 visitors and provide $81 million in economic benefit to the city.  By far, the largest event held at the park is Whoop-Up Days, an annual summer fair. Other annual events include Ag Expo, the Home & Garden Show, a weekly Farmers' Market, Country Christmas Craft Show, and Family Fest.

Governance

Exhibition Park is governed by a board of directors consisting of members of the community, including a president, two vice presidents, a past president, and a member each from the City of Lethbridge council and the County of Lethbridge council. The 2006 board of directors consisted of 14 persons.

In the 2005 budget, Exhibition Park had annual revenue of roughly $2.3 million and annual expenditures of about $2.1 million.

Notes

References
2005 Annual Report

External links
Exhibition Park website
Exhibition Park expansion project
Rocky Mountain Turf Club, manages Whoop-Up Downs, a horse racing facility

Buildings and structures in Lethbridge
Economy of Lethbridge
Tourist attractions in Lethbridge